Karinebæk halt is a railway halt serving the eastern part of the seaside resort town of Hornbæk on the north coast of North Zealand, Denmark.

The halt is located on the Hornbæk Line from Helsingør to Gilleleje and opened in 1991. The train services are currently operated by the railway company Lokaltog which runs frequent local train services between Helsingør station and Gilleleje station.

See also
 List of railway stations in Denmark

External links
Lokaltog

Railway stations in the Capital Region of Denmark
Railway stations opened in 1991
1991 establishments in Denmark
Railway stations in Denmark opened in the 20th century